Rajnandgaon is a city in Rajnandgaon District, in the state of Chhattisgarh, India.  the population of the city was 163,122. Rajnandgaon district came into existence on 26January 1973, as a result of the division of Durg district.

History

Originally known as Nandgram, Rajnandgaon State was ruled by Somvanshis, Kalachuris of Tripuri and Marathas. The palaces in the town of Rajnandgaon reveal their own tale of the rulers, their society and culture, and the traditions of those times.

The city was ruled by a dynasty of Hindu caretakers (Bairagis), who bore the title Vaishnav and Gond rajas (chiefs). Succession was by adoption. Its foundation is traced to a religious celibate who came from the Punjab towards the end of the 18th century. From the founder it passed through a succession of chosen disciples until 1879, when the British government recognized the ruler as an hereditary chief and it came to be known as princely state of Raj Nandgaon. Afterwards conferred upon his son the title of Raja Bahadur. The first ruler Mahant Ghasi Das was recognized as a feudal chief by the British government in 1865 and was granted a sanad of adoption. Later the British conferred the title of raja on the ruling mahant.

Demographics

Census 2011
 India census, Rajnandgaon had population of 1,537,133 of which male and female were 762,855 and 774,278 respectively. Rajnandgaon has an average literacy rate of 86.97%, male literacy is 91.19%, and female literacy is 82.98%.

Census 2001
 India census, Rajnandgaon had a population of 143,727. Males constituted 51% of the population and females 49%. Rajnandgaon had an average literacy rate of 73%, higher than the national average of 59.5%: male literacy is 80%, and female literacy is 65%. In Rajnandgaon, 13% of the population is under 6 years of age.

Language
Chhattisgarhi and Hindi are the main spoken languages in Rajnandgaon. Chhattisgarhi is the native language of this town, besides being followed by Hindi. People from different parts of the country live here, so other languages are also spoken by a majority of people. Some people of the city also speak dialects of Hindi such as Rajisthani and Bastari Chhattisgarh.

Sports
Digvijay Stadium is a multi-purpose stadium and is mainly used for organizing matches of football, cricket and other sports. The stadium hosted four first-class matches  in 1988 when Madhya Pradesh cricket team played against Rajasthan cricket team.

Rajnandgaon was earlier known as NURSERY OF HOCKEY
The International Hockey Stadium, which is Chhattisgarh's first international astroturf hockey stadium, is spread over an area of nearly 9.5 acres, and was built at an estimated cost of 22 crores. It was dedicated to the public on 17 January 2014 by state Governor Shekhar Dutt and chief minister Raman Singh.

Geography 
It has an average elevation of 307 . metres (1010 feet).

Climate

Transport

Railways 
Rajnandgaon railway station is on the Howrah-Nagpur-Mumbai line. The station comes under Nagpur Division of SECR. Local trains provide frequent service west to Dongargarh and Nagpur Station, and east to Raipur, while direct express trains are available for all the metros: New Delhi, Mumbai, Kolkata, Chennai, Ahmedabad, Bangalore, and Pune. Rajnandgaon railway station is the fourth busiest railway station of the state after Bilaspur, Raipur and Durg. Railway station consists of four well developed platforms. More than 190 trains passes from city. Direct connections are available for Indore, Bhopal, Jabalpur, Gwalior, Nagpur, Gondia, Wardha, Mumbai, Pune, Nashik, Hapa, Chennai, Trivandrum, Patna etc.

Bus 
Rajnandgaon has two bus stands, Old Bus Stand and New Bus Stand. Bus connectivity is good for transportation to nearby cities and villages, but long-distance bus connectivity is practically non-existent.

MSRTC under Bhandara Division provides bus services to Rajnandgaon from its various depots that interconnect Maharashtra and Chhattisgarh. Bhandara and Rajnandgaon have connected under the same link of NH6.

Notable people

See also
 Rajnandgaon (Lok Sabha constituency)
Rajnandgaon (Vidhan Sabha constituency)
Rajnandgaon ambush

References

External links
 Official website of Rajnandgaon district

 
Cities and towns in Rajnandgaon district
Former capital cities in India